Willyan Junior Mimbela Cáceres (born 15 May 1992) is a Peruvian footballer who plays for Asociación Deportiva Tarma.

References

1992 births
Living people
Association football forwards
Peruvian footballers
Peruvian expatriate footballers
Peruvian Primera División players
Sporting Cristal footballers
C.D. Nacional players
Club Alianza Lima footballers
Tractor S.C. players
Expatriate footballers in Portugal
Expatriate footballers in Iran